Hermes Point is the seaward end of a ridge from the Mountaineer Range, situated at the confluence of Icebreaker Glacier and Fitzgerald Glacier along the coast of Victoria Land, Antarctica. It was mapped by the United States Geological Survey from surveys and U.S. Navy air photos 1960–64, and was named by the Advisory Committee on Antarctic Names for Agustive A. Hermes, Jr., U.S. Navy, an aviation structural mechanic at Williams Field, McMurdo Sound, on U.S. Navy Operation Deep Freeze, 1967 and 1968.

References

Headlands of Victoria Land
Borchgrevink Coast